Millwall Docks was a railway station located in the Millwall area of the Isle of Dogs in east London. It was between South Dock and North Greenwich stations on the Millwall Extension Railway (MER) branch of the London and Blackwall Railway (LBR). It opened in December 1871 and was situated on the corner of Glengall Road (now Pepper Street) and East Ferry Road, serving the Millwall Docks (which were later merged into a single dock, rendering the name slightly anachronistic).

Passenger usage of the station was always light, and it closed to services in May 1926, along with the rest of the MER extension, though goods services continued until the demise of the docks in the 1970s. The Docklands area was heavily redeveloped in the 1980s, and most of the Docklands Light Railway (DLR) between Island Gardens and South Quay reused the old MER route through the docks. The present-day Crossharbour DLR station is located on the site of Millwall Docks station.

References

Disused railway stations in the London Borough of Tower Hamlets
Railway stations in Great Britain opened in 1871
Railway stations in Great Britain closed in 1926
Former London and Blackwall Railway stations
Millwall